Hong Kong first competed at the Deaflympics for the first time in 1985. Since then Hong Kong has been participating in the Deaflympics. Hong Kong won its first medal during the 2009 Summer Deaflympics, which is also the only medal awarded to them in Deaflympic history.

Hong Kong has yet to participate at the Winter Deaflympics.

Medal tallies

Summer Deaflympics

See also 
 Hong Kong at the Olympics
 Hong Kong at the Paralympics

References 

Nations at the Deaflympics
Hong Kong at multi-sport events
Deaf culture in Hong Kong